The Sulawesi woodcock (Scolopax celebensis) also known as Celebes woodcock, is a medium-sized wader. It is larger and darker than Eurasian woodcock but with small reddish spots.

This species is restricted to wet mountain forests on the Indonesian island of Sulawesi. Little is known of its habits.

References 

 Shorebirds by Hayman, Marchant and Prater,

External links 
 BirdLife Species Factsheet

Scolopax
Wading birds
Endemic birds of Sulawesi
Birds described in 1921
Taxa named by Joseph Harvey Riley